Union Sportive Médina Chéraga, known as USM Chéraga for short, is an Algerian football club located in Chéraga, Algeria. The club was founded in 1993. They currently play in the Ligue Nationale du Football Amateur.

References

Football clubs in Algeria
Association football clubs established in 1993
1993 establishments in Algeria
Sports clubs in Algeria